Laila Samad (3 April 1928 – 10 August 1989) was a Bangladeshi journalist, writer and actress. She was awarded Bangla Academy Literary Award in 1981 by the Government of Bangladesh.

Biography
Samad was born on 3 April 1928 in Kolkata, West Bengal, British India. She studied in Sakhawat Memorial School and Nari Shikshika Mandir. She went to Lady Brabourne College and Ashutosh College. She married her cousin, Mirza Abdus Samad, in 1946. He finished her M.A. from the University of Calcutta in 1959.

In 1950, Samad joined the magazine Begum. She worked from 1951 to 1954 at The Daily Sangbad. From 1954 to 1958, she worked at the Anannya Magazine. In 1970 she worked in the Bichitra magazine. She also acted in stage dramas and directed them in the 1950s.

Samad died on 10 August 1989 in Dhaka, Bangladesh. Dhaka Ladies Club created the Laila Samad Award in her memory.

References

1928 births
1989 deaths
Writers from Kolkata
Actresses from Kolkata
University of Calcutta alumni
Recipients of Bangla Academy Award
20th-century Bangladeshi actresses
20th-century Bangladeshi writers
20th-century Bangladeshi women writers